The Lauzière massif (French: Massif de la Lauzière) is an alpine mountain range in Savoie, France. It lies northwest of the larger Vanoise massif. It has an elevation of 2,829 metres above sea level.

See also 
 French Alps

Mountains of Savoie